Krishna Prasad Koirala was a politician, activist and social worker of Nepal.  He was the founder of the prominent Koirala family.  Three of his sons became prime ministers of Nepal.

He was a Hill Brahmin living in exile in Bihar. He had five sons and four daughters. The five sons are: Matrika Prasad Koirala, Bishweshwar Prasad Koirala, Girija Prasad Koirala, Keshav Prasad Koirala and Tarini Prasad Koirala and the four daughters were Nalini Koirala (Upadhyaya), Indira Koirala (Acharya), Sauvagya Kumari (Sauri) Koirala (Arjel) and Vijaylaxmi Koirala (Zaki). The first three sons became Prime Ministers of Nepal starting in 1951. The other two were also actively involved in the democratic politics and the popular activities to bring in and establish a democratic system in Nepal.

The famous Bollywood actress Manisha Koirala is one of his great-grand daughters.

He died in 1945.

References

1945 deaths
Koirala family